João Santos may refer to:

 João Santos (basketball) (born 1979), Portuguese basketball player
 João Fernando Santos (born 1964), Portuguese Olympic rower
 João Santos (swimmer) (born 1964), Portuguese swimmer
 João Santos (chairman) (born 1914), Portuguese businessman
 João Santos (Portuguese footballer) (born 1909), Portuguese football forward
 João dos Santos (died 1622), Portuguese Dominican missionary in India and Africa